Nicholas Dennys (13 November 1616 – 31 May 1692) was an English politician who sat in the House of Commons  from 1660 to 1678.

Dennys was the son Thomas Dennys, of Ilfracombe, Devon. He matriculated at Pembroke College, Oxford on 11 July 1634, aged 18. He was called to the bar at Inner Temple in 1646.

In 1660, Dennys was elected Member of Parliament for Barnstaple in the Convention Parliament. He was re-elected MP for Barnstaple for the Cavalier Parliament in 1661 and sat until 1678. He became a bencher of his Inn in 1662.

Dennys died at the age of 75.

References

1616 births
1692 deaths
Alumni of Pembroke College, Oxford
Members of the Inner Temple
People from Ilfracombe
Members of the Parliament of England (pre-1707) for Barnstaple
English MPs 1660
English MPs 1661–1679